Logan Verjus van Beek (born 7 September 1990) is a New Zealand-Dutch cricketer. He has played for the Netherlands national cricket team since 2012 and represents Wellington in New Zealand domestic cricket. He is an all-rounder who bats right-handed and bowls right-arm fast-medium.

Early life
Van Beek was born in Christchurch, New Zealand. He holds a Dutch passport through his paternal grandparents, who immigrated to New Zealand in the 1950s. On his mother's side he is the grandson of former Test cricketer Sammy Guillen, a dual international for the West Indies and New Zealand who was born in Trinidad.

Van Beek was in the New Zealand squad for Under-19 World Cup in 2010. He also played high-level youth basketball as a point guard, representing New Zealand at the 2009 FIBA Under-19 World Championship.

Career
Van Beek first played for the Netherlands against English county Essex in the 2012 Clydesdale Bank 40. He had to play as an overseas professional as under ICC regulations he had to wait three years after playing for New Zealand to qualify for the Netherlands. His first major international tournament for the Netherlands was the 2014 ICC World Twenty20 in Bangladesh.

He scored his maiden first-class century on 24 October 2015 in the Plunket Shield. In November 2017, in the 2017–18 Plunket Shield season, he took his maiden 10-wicket match haul in first-class cricket. In March 2018, in round six of the Plunket Shield, he took a hat-trick for Wellington against Canterbury. He was the leading wicket-taker in the 2017–18 Plunket Shield for Wellington, with 40 dismissals in seven matches. In June 2018, he was awarded a contract with Wellington for the 2018–19 season.

In December 2018, he was signed by the English side Derbyshire for the 2019 County Championship season. In April 2020, he was one of seventeen Dutch-based cricketers to be named in the team's senior squad. In June 2020, he was offered a contract by Wellington ahead of the 2020–21 domestic cricket season.

In May 2021, he was named in the Dutch One Day International (ODI) squad for their series against Scotland. He made his ODI debut on 19 May 2021, for the Netherlands against Scotland. In September 2021, van Beek was named in the Dutch squad for the 2021 ICC Men's T20 World Cup.

In July 2022, he was named in the Dutch squad for the 2022 ICC Men's T20 World Cup Global Qualifier B tournament in Zimbabwe. In their group match against Hong Kong, he became the first bowler for the Netherlands to take a hat-trick in a T20I match.

References

External links

1990 births
Living people
Beek
Canterbury cricketers
Wellington cricketers
Derbyshire cricketers
Netherlands One Day International cricketers
Netherlands Twenty20 International cricketers
Twenty20 International hat-trick takers
Sportspeople from Christchurch
New Zealand emigrants to the Netherlands
New Zealand cricketers
New Zealand people of Caribbean descent